Statistics of Úrvalsdeild in the 1933 season.

Overview
It was contested by 4 teams, and Valur won the championship.

League standings

Results

References

Úrvalsdeild karla (football) seasons
Iceland
Iceland
Urvalsdeild